The Winding Trail, is a 1921 American silent Western film directed by George Martin and starring Marjorie Clifford, Buck Manning, and William V. Mong. It was released on January 14, 1918.

Cast list
 Marjorie Clifford as Alene Hamlin
 Buck Manning as "Laughing Larry"
 William V. Mong

References

1921 films
1921 Western (genre) films
American black-and-white films
Silent American Western (genre) films
1920s American films
1920s English-language films